The difficulty of translating Beowulf from its compact, metrical, alliterative form in a single surviving but damaged Old English manuscript into any modern language is considerable, matched by the large number of attempts to make the poem approachable, and the scholarly attention given to the problem.

Among the challenges to the translator of Beowulf are whether to attempt a verse or prose rendering; how closely to stick to the original; whether to make the language archaic or to use distinctly modern phraseology; whether to domesticate or foreignize the text; to what extent to imitate the original's laconic style and understatement; and its use of intentionally poetic language to represent the heroic from what was already an ancient time when the poem was composed.

The task of the poet-translator in particular, like that of the Anglo-Saxon poet, is then to assemble multiple techniques to give the desired effects. Scholars and translators have noted that it is impossible to use all the same effects in the same places as the Beowulf poet did, but it is feasible, though difficult, to give something of the feeling of the original, and for the translation to work as poetry.

Context

Poem 

Beowulf is an Old English heroic epic poem of some 3182 lines of alliterative verse, of anonymous authorship. It was composed sometime between the 8th and the 11th century; the only surviving manuscript was written in around the year 1010.

Translations 

Beowulf has been translated many times in verse and in prose, and adapted for stage and screen. By 2020, the Beowulf's Afterlives Bibliographic Database listed some 688 translations and other versions of the poem, in at least 38 languages.

Challenges 

Among the challenges noted by the translator Michael J. Alexander are whether to attempt a verse or prose rendering; how closely to stick to the original; and whether to make the language archaic, as indeed the original was, or to use distinctly modern phraseology. In addition, the original is both laconic and full of understatement. He wrote that "the blend of metre, syntax, diction and idiom in the artistic economy of the original can only be [achieved] by redistributing the rarer effects. Each line and sentence necessarily sacrifices some quality in the original. What you lose here, you hope to restore there."

Verse or prose 

From the start, translators had reasons to put their versions of Beowulf into prose. The scholar of Old English literature writes that this was often but not always to aid study. Hugh Magennis John Mitchell Kemble's "literal" 1837 prose, forming the first complete version in modern English, was, like many that followed it, meant to assist readers in interpreting the Old English text that it accompanied. Magennis notes that Kemble stressed the "differentness" of Beowulf as a reason for not attempting to make his translation smoother.

Old English verse has rules very unlike those of modern verse. Its pattern is made up of half-lines, each of which contains two stresses, but not a fixed number of syllables, with a caesura between the halves; a sentence may end mid-line. Lines do not rhyme; internal rhyme is a rare device for special effect. Stressed words alliterated, but not in the modern sense. All vowels were considered to alliterate with each other, so the modern English word 'old' would alliterate with 'eager'. Further, the whole sound of the word should join in the alliteration, not just the first letter, so in Oft Scyld Scefing || sceaþena þreatum, the "she..." sounds echo each other across the central caesura. There had to be at least one alliterating stress in each half-line. The compact half-line phrases are often made indirect with kennings like banhus, "bone-house", meaning "body", but also implying the brief span of life while the soul is housed in the body. These can be mapped on to modern kennings, preserving the Beowulf poet's indirectness, or translated to unpack the kenning and render the meaning more or less directly:

Evidently, imitating all these features at once, and the aesthetically desired and intentional compactness of Old English verse, in any modern language, is problematic. On the other hand, abandoning the attempt and translating into prose at once loses much of the appeal of the original, though this has not deterred many authors from using the approach. J. R. Clark Hall produced first a translation in prose, in 1901, and then one in verse, in 1914.

Here, Beowulf sets sail for Heorot in the poet David Wright's popular and frequently reprinted Penguin Classics prose version, and in Seamus Heaney's prize-winning verse rendering, with word-counts to indicate relative compactness:

Magennis writes that Wright's justification for prose, that the essence of Beowulf was its story and that the job of a translation was to put this across plainly, was soon agreed by critics to be incorrect, and his version was superseded by translations such as Alexander's that captured more of the poem's feeling and style.

Alexander observed that the question of whether to translate into prose or verse is intertwined with that of freedom versus closeness to the original, writing that "Scholars who find [my verse] version too free have to consider whether literal prose does not too freely discard the potential advantages of verse."  He remarked that whereas he once thought prose renderings of poetry "useless", and most prose translations "drab", experience with several verse translations, and especially George N. Garmonsway's prose with its "dignity and rhythmical shape", changed his mind; and in any case in his view a poetic translation "is an equivalent, not a substitute". Noting that the Old English was chanted to a string accompaniment, Alexander concluded by hoping that his readers would read his verse aloud.

Nicholas Howe suggested three types of modern version: "high poetic translation", where literal accuracy is sacrificed to the spirit of the original and the presence of the poet/translator, as in William Morris, Edwin Morgan, Burton Raffel, and Seamus Heaney; "verse translation", somewhat faithful to Old English technique, with the translator much less visible, as in Charles Kennedy, Marijane Osborn, Stanley Greenfield and Roy Liuzza; and "prose translation", accurate to the narrative and parts of the poetic technique "while sacrificing most of its poetic spirit", as in John R. Clark Hall and E. Talbot Donaldson.

Faithful or free 

In 1680, the poet John Dryden proposed that translations could be classified according to how faithful or free they set out to be: 

Dryden's metaphrase, "word for word" translation, has long been a contentious issue in the case of Beowulf. In the 19th century, William Morris attempted to render each word of the original with a word or phrase, even if this was archaic or unfamiliar. For instance, he translates sceaþena as "scathers":

J. R. R. Tolkien, in his 1940 essay "On Translating Beowulf", stated that it was not possible to translate each Old English word by a single word and create a readable modern English text. He gave the example of eacen, which might mean 'stalwart', 'broad', 'huge', or 'mighty' according to the context, whereas the word's connotations are of superhuman power, having the strength of 30 men: "not 'large' but 'enlarged'".

Burton Raffel writes in his essay "On Translating Beowulf" that the poet-translator "needs to master the original in order to leave it", meaning that the text must be thoroughly understood, and then boldly departed from. His own effort to do this created what Marijane Osborn calls "the liveliest translation of Beowulf". Magennis writes that this produces "an extremely free imitative verse", at the cost of often misrepresenting the poem, in Raffel's 1963 translation. Magennis describes the version as highly accessible and readable, using alliteration lightly, and creating a "vivid and exciting narrative concerned with heroic exploits ... in a way that [the modern reader] can understand and appreciate. Clarity, logic and progression are hallmarks of this treatment of narrative in Raffel's translation, producing a satisfying impression of narrative connectedness". In contrast, John Porter's 1991 translation is avowedly "literal", published by Anglo-Saxon Books in a facing-page translation to facilitate the study of the original.

Archaic or modern 

Several 19th century translations into English used deliberately archaic diction, in line with the then popular standard approach to medieval literature. William Morris's 1910 The tale of Beowulf is described by Magennis as "a striking experiment in literary medievalism" even by Morris's standards. In Magennis's view, even if Morris's version is considered unsuccessful, it "must be seen as a major artistic engagement with the Old English poem". A. Diedrich Wackerbarth's 1849 version followed the familiar Victorian era convention of Walter Scott-like romance language with "Liegeman true" and "princely Wight", and using rhyme and modern metre (iambic tetrameters) in place of any attempt to imitate the Old English alliterative metre. Here, the Danish watchman challenges Beowulf and his men as they arrive at Heorot:

The poet and Beowulf translator Edwin Morgan stated that he was seeking to create a rendering in modern English that worked as poetry for his own age, while accurately reflecting the original. He used inventive compounds to represent Old English kennings, and sometimes incorporated alliteration. Magennis described Morgan's 1952 version "as being on a different level poetically from any translation of the poem that had been produced up until that time and a very significant piece of work in its own right", and "varied, graceful, intelligent and at times exciting". Morgan defined poetry as "the manifestation of energy in order"; in Magennis's view, this can best be seen in Morgan's "scenes of lively action and description", such as when Beowulf tracks the bleeding and mortally-wounded Grendel to his lair. In the passage, Morgan translated nicera not as the cognate "necks" or "nixies" but as "krakens". Magennis describes the rendering of the passage as "sweeping steadily onwards", but "complicated by intricate grammatical development and abrupt oppositions, dense imagery and varied rhythmical effects and ... an insistently mannered diction", reflecting the original:

Tolkien noted that whatever a translator's preferences might be, the ancients such as the Beowulf poet had chosen to write of times already long gone by, using language that was intentionally archaic and sounding poetic to their audiences. Thus, Tolkien explains, the poet uses beorn and freca to mean "warrior" or "man", this last a usage already then restricted to heroic poetry; at the time, beorn was a variant of the word for bear, just as freca was another word for wolf, and the audience expected and enjoyed hearing such words in the special circumstance of a performance by a scop. The poet used high-sounding language to represent the heroic in the distant past. Tolkien therefore advised the translator to do the same, choosing verbs like "strike" and "smite" rather than "hit" or "whack", nouns like "guest" rather than "visitor", adjectives like "courteous" instead of "polite". His versions of Beowulf's voyage to Heorot in prose and verse, the latter in strictest Anglo-Saxon alliteration and metre (with Tolkien's markup of metrical stresses), are:

Domesticating or foreignizing 
 
Magennis examines the question of domesticating or foreignizing translations of Beowulf, noting that the translation theorist Lawrence Venuti thought any domesticating translation (of any text) "scandalous". Magennis explains that the distinction follows the philosopher Friedrich Schleiermacher's 1813 analysis of whether a translation is bringing the reader to the original, i.e. foreignizing the text, or bringing the text to the reader, i.e. domesticating it. Like Venuti, Schleiermacher favoured foreignizing, but English translators have in Magennis's view for over a century preferred domesticating.

Morris's Beowulf is one of the few distinctively foreignizing translations. It has been poorly received by critics including Morgan, who called it "disastrously bad" and "often more obscure than the original", but later scholars such as Roy Liuzza, whose translation of Beowulf is much admired, are more accepting; Liuzza writes that Morris was "trying to recreate the experience of reading Beowulf in the depth of its history".

Wright's 1957 prose translation is somewhat modernising, aiming for a plain "middle style" between archaism and colloquialism under the banner "better no colours than faked ones", but striving to be as faithful as possible. The novelist Maria Dahvana Headley's 2020 translation is relatively free, domesticating and modernising, though able to play with Anglo-Saxon-style kennings, such as rendering  as "warrior-woman", meaning Grendel's mother. Her feminism is visible in her rendering of the lament of the Geatish woman at the end of the poem:

A complicating factor is that Beowulf scholarship has been affected by nationalist thinking in various countries. Heaney, a Catholic poet from Northern Ireland (often called "Ulster"), could domesticate Beowulf to the old rural dialect of his childhood family only at the risk of being accused of cultural appropriation. Howell Chickering, for example, who made a verse translation of Beowulf in 1977, wrote that Heaney's use of "Ulsterisms" in the translation, like "hirpling", "keshes", "[a] wean", "reavers", and "bothies", was "a signal of cultural difference", incomprehensible to many readers, and rightly glossed in footnotes. He called Heaney's use of two "different Englishes" "bad cultural and linguistic history", and that it placed the poem as his work rather than as a translation.

Luis Lerate, creating the first complete verse translation in Spanish in 1974, faced the challenge of introducing both an unfamiliar story and an unknown verse-form to his audience. He opted to re-create the cadences of Old English, seeking in  María José Gómez-Calderón's view to "reproduce the dignified, elevated tone" and "remarkabl[y]" keeping the number of syllables down to fit the metre convincingly, as shown by the sombre conclusion of the poem:

Translating into a language much closer to Old English, Icelandic, the poet Halldóra B. Björnsson had to contend with the possibility of a translation that simultaneously preserved the original's semantics, syntax, and phonology (meaning, function, and form), in what Pétur Knútsson calls a "transliteration", as in "" for "" ("That was a good king!") in line 11. He notes at once that her 1968 version,  ("The Lay of Bjólfur") rarely does this, opting for sound, form, and connection with mythology over "literal" meaning and syntax. Knútsson gives as an instance of this the use of "" for "shoulder" rather than "", cognate with Old English "" in line 1539; this recalls the fourteenth-century , which some scholars believe is linked to Beowulf – it tells of a hero and his men who venture into a cave of dragons who are guarding a treasure.

Laconic and understated, but embellished 

The author of a popular and widely used 1973 translation, Michael J. Alexander, writes that since the story was familiar to its Anglo-Saxon audience, the telling was all-important. The audience liked "the elaborate unstraightforwardness with which the expected is disguised", accompanied by "laconic understatement" and negative constructions. Thus, after Wiglaf has had to kill the dragon to enter its mound, he narrates that his reptilian host showed him "little courtesy" for his visit. 

Alexander comments that such "grim humour" lives on in the northeastern parts of England where the Vikings settled. 

Further, the Old English text is full of embellishments, especially verbal parallels, opposites and variations, so that as the scholar Frederick Klaeber stated, there is a "lack of steady advance"; the narrative takes a step forwards, then a step sideways with "traditional near-synonyms". Alexander gives as example lines 405–407, telling that Beowulf speaks to Hrothgar – but before he opens his mouth, there are three half-lines describing and admiring his shining mail-shirt in different ways:

Magennis comments of Heaney's version of these lines that he greatly develops the Old English image with his vigorous description, noting that he "is particularly attracted to the net and sewing/weaving metaphors" that the Beowulf poet used of chain mail, and that Heaney consistently associates armour with "webbing".

Assembling multiple effects 

Liuzza notes that Beowulf itself describes the technique of a court poet in assembling materials:

Liuzza comments that wrixlan (weaving) and gebindan (binding) evocatively suggest the construction of Old English verse, tying together half-lines with alliteration and syllable stresses, just as rhyme and metre do in a Shakespearean sonnet. These effects are hard to achieve in modern English, he notes, not least because Old English is an inflected language, not requiring additional prepositions and definite articles like "of the" and "from", "the" and "in" for the sense. Old English audiences, too, were comfortable with the use of many inexact synonyms to provide varying sounds to suit the alliterative scheme, without necessarily adding much to the meaning of the poem; Liuzza gives the example of "king", which might for example be rendered cyning, dryhten, hyrde, ræswa, sigedryhten, þeodcyning, weard, or wine, meaning if interpreted literally "king", "lord", "shepherd", "prince", "victorious lord", "king of the people", "guardian", and "friend".

The exact combination of effects used in the original cannot, as Alexander has stated, be echoed line by line, but the translator can attempt to achieve some equivalent mix of effects in a passage as a whole. He illustrates this with lines 127–128:

Notes

References

Sources

External links 

  – a selection of translations
 e-Beowulf text, edited by Kevin Kiernan

Beowulf
Translation studies